A confectionery store (more commonly referred to as a sweet shop in the United Kingdom, a candy shop or candy store in North America, or a lolly shop in Australia and New Zealand) sells confectionery and the intended market is usually children. Most confectionery stores are filled with an assortment of sweets far larger than a grocer or convenience store could accommodate. They often offer a selection of old-fashioned treats and sweets from different countries. Very often unchanged in layout since their inception, confectioneries are known for their warming and nostalgic feel.

History 

Akisato Ritō's Miyako meisho zue (An Illustrated Guide to the Capital) from 1787 describes a confectionery store situated near the Great Buddha erected by Toyotomi Hideyoshi, then one of Kyoto's most important tourist attractions.

In 1917, there were 55 confectionery shops in Harrisburg, Pennsylvania, which had a population of 70,000 people.

Guinness World Records has recognized a store in the village of Pateley Bridge as being the oldest continuously operating sweet shop in the world.  The Oldest Sweet Shop in the World was founded in 1827.

Modern confectionery stores 
Architectural Digest released a list of beautifully designed candy stores in 2015. The list included: Dylan's Candy Bar in Miami, the Candy Room in Melbourne, Candylawa in Riyadh, SugarSin in London, and Méert in Lille.

M&Ms London claims to be the world's largest candy store, measuring 35,000 square feet across four floors.

Products

See also

 Candy making
 Konditorei

References 

Retailers by type of merchandise sold